LIMC may refer to:

 Malpensa Airport
 Lexicon Iconographicum Mythologiae Classicae